Re T&D Industries plc [2000] BCC 956 is a UK insolvency law case, concerning the policy of administration of a company in financial distress. It held that administrators have the clear power to deal with the company's property as is necessary if under the pressure of time before there is a creditors' meeting.

Facts
The two administrators of T&D Industries plc (from PWC) wished to dispose of the company's assets before a creditors' meeting had taken place as required by the Insolvency Act 1986 s 24 (now Schedule B1, para 51). Section 17(2)(a) (now updated in schedule B1, para 1) contained the ambiguously worded provision that an administrator can manage the affairs, business and property of the company,

Counsel for the administrators argued that this should be taken, on a first interpretation, to mean that the administrator could do anything, unless it was prohibited under the administration order for their appointment. Failing that, a second interpretation was that any disposal of the company's assets could be made, so long as the administrator had authorised it.

Judgment
Neuberger J held that court approval was not needed, and the proper interpretation of section 17(2)(a) was that the administrator could do anything, unless it was prohibited under the administration order for their appointment. This was so reading together with section 14(1) which empowered the administrator to do anything necessary for the company's management. Furthermore the policy of administration favoured expediency, and so section 14 could not be effectively operated, were it otherwise, without the court's sanction. Only one case actually decided the issue, namely, Re Charnley Davies Ltd, and that supported this view. He concluded as follows.

See also
UK insolvency law
Re Transbus International Ltd [2004] EWHC 932 (Ch)

Notes

References

United Kingdom insolvency case law
High Court of Justice cases
1999 in case law
1999 in British law